Vehicle registration plates are the mandatory number plates used to display the registration mark of a vehicle, and have existed in Spain since 1900. Most motor vehicles which are used on public roads are required by law to display them. The government agency responsible for the registration and numbering of vehicles is the Directorate General of Traffic.

Current system
Spain currently uses the format of L nnnn LLL where:
 nnnn is a sequence number from 0000 to 9999,
 LLL is a "counter" comprising three letters, which increments after the sequence number reaches 9999. The consonants B, C, D, F, G, H, J, K, L, M, N, P, R, S, T, V, W, X, Y and Z are used for a total of 80 million possible registrations in the system.
 L see Colour plates. It is not used in private vehicles.

This format, introduced on 18 September 2000, is used nationwide, so there is no way of knowing where the vehicle was registered. The "counter" gives a rough idea of when the vehicle was registered, but is less reliable for determining its age, as imported second-hand vehicles are registered in the same way as new models.

In August 2022 the three-letter counter reached the L-series, which began with MBB. At the current rate of approximately five series per decade, the system will be exhausted around 2040.

The plates themselves are white with black characters, front and back, with a blue strip on the left containing the 12 stars of the flag of Europe and the country identifier E (for España). This strip is compulsory. The plates are usually rectangular and wide in shape, but there are also square-like plates for motorcycles, while some cars have a narrow plate inset (such as at the back of the SEAT 600).

History
Two previous systems have been used, both of which were province-based.

1900 to 1971 
The first system, introduced in 1900, consisted of a letter code denoting the province the vehicle was registered in (the full list of codes appears below), followed by a sequence number of up to six digits (XXX-NNNNNN). The codes were normally made up of the first one or two letters of the province name or the name of the provincial capital (many provinces are named after their capitals), under the provisions of a 1926 regulation. In the earliest days, some provinces used three-letter codes, but these were abolished after 1926.

This system came to an end in October 1971, by which time both Madrid and Barcelona were approaching the number 999999. Older vehicles with such registrations, usually with five- or six-digit numbers, can still be seen on Spanish roads.

In the later years of this system, many plates were white with black characters. Today, there are a few rare cases where the blue EU country identifier strip is also carried, as plates are reissued in new format but with the same number sequence when deteriorated or lost.

1971 to 2000 

The second system used the format XXX-NNNN-YY, where XXX was the province code or a one- two- or three-letter special code (such as ET for army cars and DGP for police cars), NNNN was a sequence number from 0000 to 9999 (always four-digit numbers, padded with leading zeroes if necessary), and YY was a "counter" series consisting of one and then two letters, which incremented after the sequence number reached 9999.

No "counter" series used the consonants Q and R (and Q has never been allowed in any way, the apparent reason for this being its resemblance to the vowel O and the digit 0), while two-letter combinations ending in the vowels A, E, I and O were also forbidden, apparently to avoid the forming of potentially offensive Spanish words when combined with some province codes (such as MA-LA, meaning "bad one", or CU-LO, meaning "arse"). This meant that, for instance, Z was followed by AB, while AN was followed by AP and then AS, and PZ was followed by SB.

Other potentially offensive combinations, however, were allowed, such as KK (resembling caca, meaning "shit") and PN (resembling pene, meaning "penis"). Also allowed were combinations with potential political connotations, such as HB (cf. Herri Batasuna) and PP (cf. Partido Popular). The only combination that was actually skipped was WC in Madrid and Barcelona. Finally, some otherwise "forbidden" combinations (particularly those containing R or ending in one of the skipped vowels) were exceptionally used in a few particular cases, such as on some special types of cars (e.g. RA, RB... for some police cars, and EA for Spanish Air Force land vehicles).

This system lasted until September 2000, by which time Madrid was running out of registrations again, its "counter" reaching series ZX. Barcelona reached series XG, while the next province by registration volume, Valencia, was far behind at series HJ. Therefore, the allowed combinations ZY and ZZ were never issued in any province.

Under this system, plates usually consisted solely of black characters on white, though the blue EU country identifier strip became an option in the 1990s.

Both systems were susceptible to problems with rivalries between regions, that caused trouble for drivers travelling out of their provinces or trying to sell their vehicles second-hand. The second system was also affected when the major languages of Spain were co-officialized, with the renaming of some provinces resulting in mismatches between the name and the code. For instance, the GE code for Gerona became mismatched when that province was renamed Girona after the Catalan became official, so it was replaced with the GI code. Similarly, the OR code for Orense was replaced with the OU code for Ourense (official Galician name for the province). There were also unsuccessful movements to have other province codes changed, such as replacing the Asturias code O (from its capital Oviedo) with AS, this movement being prompted by the rivalry between Oviedo and the province's largest city, Gijón, some of whose residents chose to register their vehicles in Girona, the GI code also being the first two letters of "Gijón". The La Rioja code LO (from its capital Logroño) was finally slated for replacement with LR on the same day that the current system entered use.

Old provincial codes

Special plates

Commercial Vehicles
To comply with Third-party insurance risks, vehicles carrying goods or persons not otherwise insured require a small white plate (150mmx75mm) with the letters SP (for servicio publico)in black. this is fixed near the rear numberplate

Taxis and private hire (VTT) that have authorisation to operate display the rear plate with a blue background and an SP plate mentioned above  Vehicles without these markings are not legal for hire.

State codes
These keep the old system of letter code plus numbers.

Diplomatic plates

Diplomatic plates are either red, green, yellow or blue and start with the letters "CD" (red) for diplomatic cars, "CC" (green) for consular cars, "TA" (yellow) for ancillary workers' cars or "OI" (blue) for cars belonging to international organisations. The first set of numbers stands for the embassy or organisation and the second for the specific car from an organisation.

U.S. military
Up until 1972 U.S. Military personnel were required to have special plates.

Colour plates

There are other plates with different background colours for trailers and the so-called "tourist plates", provisory plates that allow foreigners to use a vehicle bought in Spain before registering it in their country.
The trailer plates begin with the prefix R signifying remolque, the Spanish word for trailer, caravan or literally "on tow".
The tourist plates begin with the prefix P signifying provisional, usually issued to vehicles for export or until the registration process has been completed.  They are sometimes seen on manufacturer's prototypes.
An additional series exists for historic vehicles with the prefix H followed by four numbers and four letters, making a nine digit plate which can be difficult to fit onto some historic vehicles. Mopeds and microcars with cylinders under 50 cc were not required to have a national plate and town and city administration tax them and issued their own yellow plates.

Diplomatic codesSpanish diplomatic codes
This is a table of country codes on Spanish diplomatic and consular car number plates, i.e. the first group of two or three numbers and mainly sorted by Spanish alphabetical order.

References

Bibliografy

External links
 
 Spanish webpage with information and photos of all provinces of Spain
 Photos of license plates of Spain

Spain
Transport in Spain
Spain transport-related lists
 Registration plates